Kanwaljit Singh may refer to:
 Kanwaljit Singh (politician), Indian politician
 Kanwaljit Singh (actor), Indian actor
 Kanwaljit Singh (cricketer), Indian former first-class cricketer
 Prince Kanwaljit Singh,  Indian Punjabi film actor

See also
 Kanwaljit Singh Bakshi, New Zealand politician